The Astrid Lindgren Memorial Award is an international children's literary award established by the Swedish government in 2002 to honour the Swedish children's author Astrid Lindgren (1907–2002). The prize is five million SEK, making it the richest award in children's literature and one of the richest literary prizes in the world. The annual cost of 10 million SEK (in 2008) is financed with tax money.

The Lindgren Award annually recognises one or more living people and extant institutions (twelve in the first ten years) - people for their career contributions and institutions for their long-term sustainable work. Specifically they should be "authors, illustrators, oral storytellers and promoters of reading" whose "work is of the highest quality, and in the spirit of Astrid Lindgren." The object of the award is to increase interest in children's and young people's literature, and to promote children's rights to culture on a global level.

The award is administered by the Swedish Arts Council funded solely by the central government.
Officially it is called "An award by the Swedish people to the world". The award ceremony is presided over by Crown Princess Victoria of Sweden.

"The award recipients are chosen by a jury with broad expertise in international children's and young adult literature, reading promotion and children's rights. The 12 members include authors, literary critics and scholars, illustrators and librarians. One member represents Astrid Lindgren's family."

The annual cycle begins no later than December about 9 months before nominees are announced, 15 months before the winner is announced and 18 months before the presentation.

Winners 

In the first seventeen annual cycles through 2018 there were 18 recipients, fifteen people and three institutions. There were two inaugural awards in 2003 and two again in 2005.

Five of the Lindgren Award winners have also, and much earlier, won the older, international Hans Christian Andersen Award for their lifetime contributions to children's literature: Sendak and Erlbruch as an illustrator; Nöstlinger, Nunes, and Paterson as writers. In 2020, Woodson also won the Andersen Award as a writer. (Astrid Lindgren won the Andersen Award in 1958.)

See also
 
List of literary awards

References

External links 

  

Children's literary awards
Swedish literary awards
International literary awards
Literary awards honoring writers
Swedish speculative fiction awards
Astrid Lindgren
 
Awards established in 2003
2003 establishments in Sweden